Idman Azerbaijan TV ("Sport Azerbaijan TV") is a state-controlled television channel in Azerbaijan. It began broadcasting from Baku on 1 January 2009 and primarily airs live sporting events and sport-related programming.

The channel is owned by the Azerbaijan Television and Radio Broadcasting Closed Joint-stock Company, of which the Government of Azerbaijan is the only shareholder. This company also owns the channels AzTV and Mədəniyyət TV (Culture TV).

Idman Azerbaijan TV channel, satellite and internet broadcasts are partially interrupted due to international sports rights. It is valid in terrestrial and cable broadcasts in Azerbaijan. When there is a match on the Azerspace-1 satellite, the BISS is encrypted from the satellite. All programs are available on terrestrial and cable television broadcasts in Azerbaijan.

References

External links
Official website 

Television stations in Azerbaijan
Television networks in Azerbaijan
Azerbaijani-language television stations
Sports television networks
Television channels and stations established in 2009
2009 establishments in Azerbaijan